Armando Rami (born 24 September 1997) is an Albanian footballer who plays as a defender for Kastrioti in the Kategoria Superiore. He was born in Burrel, Albania.He knows with nickname RAMI.

Career

Kastrioti
In January 2019, Rami signed with Kastrioti in the Albanian Superliga. He made his debut for the club on 27 January 2019, coming on as a 76th-minute substitute for Lukman Hussein in a 5-1 away victory over Luftëtari. In this match, Rami also scored his first goal for the club, netting in the 86th minute and making the score 4-1 to Kastrioti.

Career statistics

Club

References

External links
Armando Rami at Eurosport

1997 births
Living people
FC Kamza players
KS Kastrioti players
Kategoria Superiore players
Kategoria e Parë players
Albanian footballers
Association football defenders
People from Mat (municipality)